Yagodnaya Polyana is a rural locality (a village) in Dmitriyevsky Selsoviet, Ufimsky District, Bashkortostan, Russia. The population was 417 as of 2010. There are 6 streets.

Geography 
Yagodnaya Polyana is located 22 km northwest of Ufa (the district's administrative centre) by road. Ushakovo is the nearest rural locality.

References 

Rural localities in Ufimsky District